Charles Garland may refer to:

 Charles Garland (Australian politician) (1854–1930), Australian politician and mining entrepreneur
 Charles Garland (British politician) (1887–1960), British Conservative Party politician and chemist
 Chuck Garland (1898–1971), American tennis player
 Charles Garland (philanthropist) (1899–1974), American philanthropist